William Raymond may refer to:
 William H. Raymond (1844–1916), American soldier and Medal of Honor recipient
 William Gawtress Raymond (1855–1942), member of the House of Commons of Canada
 Bill Raymond (born 1938), American actor
 William Raymond (curler)

See also
 William Forbes Raymond (1785–1860), Archdeacon of Northumberland